Woodbourne is a historic plantation house located near Forest, Bedford County, Virginia. It was built in three two-story sections and representative of Federal period architecture.  The earliest dates to about 1785, and is the frame east wing.  The central stuccoed brick section was added about 1810, and the frame west wing between about 1815 and 1820.  It has a slate gable roof with a central pediment and exterior end chimneys.  Also on the property are a contributing small, handsome brick office, a weatherboarded cook's house and storeroom, a lattice wellhouse, and icehouse.

It was listed on the National Register of Historic Places in 1973.

References

Plantation houses in Virginia
Houses on the National Register of Historic Places in Virginia
Federal architecture in Virginia
Houses completed in 1797
Houses in Bedford County, Virginia
National Register of Historic Places in Bedford County, Virginia
1797 establishments in Virginia